"Let's Get Serious" is a song written by Lee Garrett and Stevie Wonder and the title track to Jermaine Jackson's 1980 Motown album Let's Get Serious. Released as a single, it became Jackson's first number-one R&B hit and second top-ten pop hit. It also reached the top ten in the UK. The recording was produced by Stevie Wonder, who also provided vocals for the track.

It was ranked number one on the Billboard soul chart for the year in 1980, edging out brother Michael's Platinum-certified mega-hit "Rock with You", which ranked at number two.

Charts

References

1980 singles
1980 songs
Jermaine Jackson songs
Songs written by Stevie Wonder
Songs written by Lee Garrett
Motown singles